is a broadcasting station affiliated with Japan News Network (JNN) in Niigata, Niigata.  It broadcasts in Niigata Prefecture, Japan and was established on December 24, 1958.

TV channel

Digital Television 
 Yahiko 17ch JODR-DTV 3 kW

Relay stations 
 Takada 18ch
 Mikawa 39ch
 Tsunan-Kamigō 18ch
 Koide 24ch 
 Kanose 17ch 
 Itoigawa-Ōno 18ch
 Tsunan 18ch
 Ryōtsu 31ch 
 Aikawa 28ch 
 Yamato 18ch 
 Takachi 17ch 
 Arai 44ch
 Murakami 18ch 
 Sotokaifu 24ch 
 Yuzawa 17ch
 Tsunan-Tanaka 17ch
 Sumon 18ch
 Muramatsu 39ch
 Sekikawa 43ch
 Tochio 43ch
 Muikamachi 18ch  
 Myōkōkōgen 44ch
 Ōmi 18ch
 Kawaguchi 17ch

Radio

AM 
 Niigata JODR 1116 kHz 50 kW
 Joetsu JODO 1530 kHz 1 kW
 Nagaoka JODE 1062 kHz 100 W

FM (simulcast) 
 Niigata 92.7 MHz FM 10 kW

Program

External links
 The official website of Broadcasting System of Niigata 

Japan News Network
Television stations in Japan
Television channels and stations established in 1958
Mass media in Niigata (city)
Companies based in Niigata Prefecture
1958 establishments in Japan